Maccabi Petah Tikva is a handball team from the city of Petah Tikva, Israel.

Maccabi is one of the oldest handball clubs in the country, the most successful period was in the late 70's and early 80's when the team won 3 championships and two State cups.

In August 1997 Maccabi merged with Hapoel Petah Tikva and played as Ironi Petah Tikva for 12 seasons in the top division. In September 2009 the merger was over as the supporters of Hapoel reformed their team.

Titles 
Israel Champions (3): 1978, 1980, 1981
Israel Cup Holder (2): 1977, 1981

References

Handball clubs established in 1960
Israeli handball clubs
Sport in Petah Tikva